A board room is the meeting place of a board of directors.

Board Room or Boardroom may also refer to:

 Boardroom, Inc., now Bottom Line, Inc., an American publisher
 The Boardroom, an Australian television movie
 Board Room, Alaska Airline's airport lounge
 Boardroom (company), an American media network founded by Kevin Durant and Rich Kleiman